Blues Image is the self-titled debut album of the rock band Blues Image. The album was released in 1969 and peaked at #112 on the Billboard charts.

Track listing
All tracks composed and arranged by Blues Image
"Take Me to the Sunrise" - 4:10 	
"Leaving My Troubles Behind" - 3:45 	
"Outside Was Night" - 3:44 	
"In Front Behind You" - 3:10 	
"Lay Your Sweet Love on Me" - 2:12 	
"(Do You Have) Somethin' to Say" - 3:55 	
"Lazy Day Blues" - 4:50 	
"Yesterday Could Be Today" - 2:08 	
"Reality Does Not Inspire" - 9:08

Personnel
Blues Image
Mike Pinera – guitar; lead vocals (tracks 1, 3-9); backing vocals (track 2)
Skip Konte – piano, organ; backing vocals (track 3)
Malcolm Jones - bass
Manuel Bertematti – drums
Joe Lala - congas; lead vocals (tracks 1, 2); backing vocals (track 3, 5)

References

External links
 

Blues Image albums
1969 debut albums
Atco Records albums
albums recorded at Wally Heider Studios